Daylaqlı (also, Daylagly, until 2003, Əzızbəyov and Azizbekov) is a village and municipality in the Shahbuz District of Nakhchivan, Azerbaijan. It is located in the near of the Yevlakh-Lachin-Nakhchivan highway, 4 km from the district center, on the bank of the Nakhchivanchay river. Its population is busy with farming and animal husbandry. There are secondary school, club, library and a medical center in the village. It has a population of 391.

References 

Populated places in Shahbuz District